Sigma Librae (σ Librae, abbreviated Sigma Lib, σ Lib) is a binary star in the constellation of Libra. The apparent visual magnitude is +3.29, making it visible to the naked eye. At that distance, the visual magnitude is diminished by 0.20 ± 0.17 from extinction caused by intervening gas and dust.

The two components are designated Sigma Librae A (officially named Brachium , the traditional name for the system) and B.

Nomenclature 

σ Librae (Latinised to Sigma Librae) is the system's current Bayer designation (the star originally bore the designation Gamma Scorpii)  and did not receive its current designation until the new designation was agreed upon by Commission 3 of the International Astronomical Union (IAU) on July 31, 1930.) The designations of the two components as Sigma Librae A and B derives from the convention used by the Washington Multiplicity Catalog (WMC) for multiple star systems, and adopted by the International Astronomical Union (IAU).

It bore the traditional Latin names Brachium (arm) and Cornu (horn), and the non-unique minor Arabic names Zuben el Genubi (southern claw) (shared with Alpha Librae); Zuben Hakrabi (shared with Gamma Librae and Eta Librae, also rendered as Zuban Alakrab), and Ankaa (shared with Alpha Phoenicis). In 2016, the IAU organized a Working Group on Star Names (WGSN) to catalog and standardize proper names for stars. The WGSN decided to attribute proper names to individual stars rather than entire multiple systems. It approved the name Brachium for the primary component Sigma Librae A on 5 September 2017. Ankaa had previously been approved as the name for Alpha Phoenicis on 29 July 2016. Both are now so included in the List of IAU-approved Star Names.

Properties

The primary, Sigma Librae A, has a spectral class M2.5 III, which places it in the red giant stage of its evolution. This is a semi-regular variable star with a single pulsation period of 20 days. It shows small amplitude variations in magnitude of 0.10–0.15 on time scales as brief as 15–20 minutes, with cycles of repetition over intervals of 2.5–3.0 hours. This form of variability indicates that the star is on the asymptotic giant branch and is generating energy through the nuclear fusion of hydrogen and helium along concentric shells surrounding an inert core of carbon and oxygen.

The companion, Sigma Librae B, is of the 16th magnitude and over an arc minute away.

References

External links 

Libra (constellation)
Librae, Sigma
M-type giants
Brachium
Librae, 20
Semiregular variable stars
073714
133216
5603
Durchmusterung objects